Planetfall may refer to:

Planetfall, a 1983 video game
Planetfall (novel), a 2015 novel by Emma Newman, and the first in the series of novels of the same name
Age of Wonders: Planetfall, a 2019 video game
"Planet Fall", the seventh episode of My Dad the Bounty Hunter
Planetfall, a game engine used by multiplayer game Rise: The Vieneo Province